= Veral =

Village in Maharashtra

Veral is a village in Ratnagiri district, Maharashtra state in Western India. The 2011 Census of India recorded a total of 3,171 residents in the village. Veral's geographical area is approximately 503 hectares (1,240 acres).
